The 2022 FIFA World Cup qualification was the qualifying process which decided the 31 teams that would join hosts Qatar, who received an automatic spot, at the 2022 FIFA World Cup.

Parallel tournaments were organised by FIFA's six confederations. Qualification started on 6 June 2019 with several matches of the AFC zone, the first being between Mongolia and Brunei, and ended on 14 June 2022 with an inter-confederation play-off between Costa Rica and New Zealand. Mongolian player Norjmoogiin Tsedenbal netted the first goal, while the last one was scored by Joel Campbell of Costa Rica. In contrast to previous editions, there was no general preliminary draw, with confederations carrying out separate draws due to their differing timelines. The qualification process suffered numerous postponements from March 2020 onwards due to the COVID-19 pandemic.

Qualified teams

Notes

Qualification process
All FIFA member associations, of which there are currently 211, were eligible to enter qualification. Qatar, as hosts, qualified automatically for the tournament. However, Qatar was obliged by the AFC to participate in the Asian qualifying stage as the first two rounds also acted as qualification for the 2023 AFC Asian Cup. Qatar won their group so the fifth-best group runners-up advanced to the AFC third round instead. For the first time after the initial two tournaments of 1930 and 1934, the World Cup will be hosted by a country whose national team has never played a finals match before. The reigning World Cup champions France also participated in qualifying as normal.

The allocation of slots for each confederation was discussed by the FIFA Executive Committee on 30 May 2015 in Zürich after the FIFA Congress. The committee decided that the same allocation used in 2006, 2010, and 2014 would be kept for the 2018 and 2022 tournaments:

 AFC (Asia): 4 or 5
 CAF (Africa): 5
 CONCACAF (North, Central America and Caribbean): 3 or 4
 CONMEBOL (South America): 4 or 5
 OFC (Oceania): 0 or 1
 UEFA (Europe): 13
 Hosts: 1

Summary of qualification

Withdrew or suspended
North Korea withdrew from the AFC second qualifying round for safety concerns related to the COVID-19 pandemic.

Other smaller island states likewise retracted their participation during the World Cup qualification: Saint Lucia, American Samoa, Samoa, Vanuatu and Cook Islands, while Tonga withdrew after the 2022 Hunga Tonga–Hunga Ha'apai eruption and tsunami.

On 9 December 2019, the World Anti-Doping Agency initially handed Russia a four-year ban from all major international sporting events, after RUSADA was found non-compliant for handing over manipulated lab data to investigators. However, the Russia national team could still enter qualification, as the ban only applies to the World Cup proper as a world championship. The WADA ruling allowed athletes who were not involved in doping or the coverup to compete, but prohibited the use of the Russian flag and anthem at major international sporting events. An appeal to the Court of Arbitration for Sport was filed, but WADA's decision was upheld though reduced to a two-year ban. The CAS ruling also allowed the name "Russia" to be displayed on uniforms if the words "Neutral Athlete" or "Neutral Team" have equal prominence. If Russia had qualified for the tournament, its players would not have been able to use their country's name alone, flag or anthem at the World Cup, as a result of the nation's two-year ban from world championships and Olympic Games in all sports. On 27 February 2022, after the threat of boycotts by the Czech Republic, Poland and Sweden amid the Russian invasion of Ukraine, FIFA prohibited the Russia national football team from playing home matches in Russia; the team would have to play matches behind closed doors at neutral sites. In addition, the team would have been prohibited from competing under the name, flag, or national anthem of Russia, and had to compete under the name "Football Union of Russia" (RFU). On 28 February, however, in accordance with a recommendation by the International Olympic Committee (IOC), FIFA suspended the participation of Russia. Poland were subsequently given a walkover for their play-off semi-final match scheduled against Russia. The Russian Football Union announced they would appeal the decision to the Court of Arbitration for Sport. Their request for a temporary lift of the ban was rejected on 18 March.

Format
The formats of the qualifying competitions depended on each confederation (see below). Each round might be played in either of the following formats:
League format, in which more than two teams formed groups to play home-and-away round-robin matches, or in exceptions permitted by the FIFA Organising Committee, single round-robin matches hosted by one of the participating teams or on neutral territory.
Knockout format, in which two teams play home-and-away two-legged matches or single-legged matches.

Tiebreakers
In league format, the ranking of teams in each group is based on the following criteria (regulations Articles 20.4 and 20.6):
 Points (3 points for a win, 1 point for a draw, 0 points for a loss)
 Overall goal difference
 Overall goals scored
 Points in matches between tied teams
 Goal difference in matches between tied teams
 Goals scored in matches between tied teams
 Away goals scored in matches between tied teams (if the tie is only between two teams in home-and-away league format)
 Fair play points
 first yellow card: minus 1 point
 indirect red card (second yellow card): minus 3 points
 direct red card: minus 4 points
 yellow card and direct red card: minus 5 points
 Drawing of lots by the FIFA Organising Committee

In cases when teams finishing in the same position across different groups are compared to determine which teams advance to the next stage, the criteria depend on the competition format and require the approval of FIFA (regulations Article 20.8).

In knockout format, the team that has the higher aggregate score over the two legs progresses to the next round. If aggregate scores finish level, then the away goals rule is applied. The away goals rule is again applied after extra time. If no goals are scored during extra time, the tie is decided by penalty shoot-out (regulations Article 20.10).

Confederation qualification

AFC

The opening two rounds of qualifying also served as qualification for the 2023 AFC Asian Cup. Therefore, Qatar, the 2022 FIFA World Cup host, only participated in the first two rounds of qualifying.

The qualification structure is as follows:
First round: 12 teams (ranked 35–46) played home-and-away over two legs. The six winners advanced to the second round.
Second round: 40 teams (ranked 1–34, including Qatar as the host, and the six winners from the first round) were divided into eight groups of five teams to play home-and-away round-robin matches. The eight group winners and the four best group runners-up were set to advance to the third round. As Qatar won their group, the fifth-best runner-up advanced in their stead.
Third round: 12 teams that had advanced from the second round were divided into two groups of 6 teams to play home-and-away round-robin matches. The top two teams of each group qualified for the World Cup, and the two third-placed teams advanced to the fourth round.
Fourth round: One third-placed team in each third round group played against each other in a single match, the winners advanced to the inter-confederation play-offs.

Final positions (third round)

Fourth round

CAF

CAF announced on 10 July 2019 a reversion to the format used for its 2014 FIFA World Cup qualification competition.

First round: Twenty-eight teams (ranked 27–54) played home-and-away over two legs. The fourteen winners advanced to the second round.
Second round: Forty teams (teams ranked 1–26 and fourteen first-round winners) were divided into ten groups of four teams to play home-and-away round-robin matches. The ten group winners advanced to the third round.
Third round: Ten teams that had advanced from the second round played home-and-away over two legs. The five winners qualified for the World Cup, and no teams advance to the intercontinental playoffs.

Third round

CONCACAF

CONCACAF initially announced on 10 July 2019 a restructured format for the qualifiers of the 2022 FIFA World Cup. However, on 25 June 2020, following FIFA's decision to postpone the September international window because of the pandemic, CONCACAF noted that "the challenges presented by postponements to the football calendar, and the incomplete FIFA rankings cycle in our confederation, means our current World Cup qualifying process has been compromised and will be changed." On 27 July, CONCACAF announced a new qualifying format for the World Cup.

First round: Thirty CONCACAF teams, ranked 6 to 35 based on the FIFA rankings of July 2020, were drawn into six groups of five and played single round-robin matches (two home and two away), the six group winners advanced to the second round.
Second round: Six first round group winners played in a two-legged home-and-away series. The three winners advanced to the third round.
Third round: Eight teams, three second-round winners and the top five CONCACAF teams (Mexico, United States, Costa Rica, Jamaica, and Honduras) also based on those FIFA rankings, played home-and-away round-robin matches in one single group. The top three teams qualified for the World Cup and the fourth-placed team advanced to the inter-confederation play-offs.

Final positions (third round)

CONMEBOL

The CONMEBOL Council decided on 24 January 2019 to maintain the same qualification structure used for the previous six tournaments. From October 2020 to March 2022 (previously scheduled for March 2020 to November 2021, but later postponed by the pandemic), all ten CONMEBOL teams played in a league of home-and-away round-robin matches. The top four teams qualified for the World Cup and the fifth-placed team advanced to the inter-confederation play-offs.

Final positions

OFC

Qualifying was expected to begin in September 2020, but the FIFA international window in that month for the OFC was postponed by the pandemic.

Earlier in July that year, the OFC submitted a proposal to FIFA for the qualifiers in response to the pandemic, intending to organise a group stage in March and June 2021 followed by semi-finals and a final in September and October of that year. After continued delays, by September 2021 the OFC felt it was "not possible at this time to organise a qualifying competition within the Oceania region" and it was instead staged in Qatar in March 2022.

The qualifying stage was to be a single match on 13 March 2022 between the two lowest-ranked participating OFC nations in the FIFA World Rankings, with the winner advancing to the group stage. Then eight remaining teams were drawn into two groups of four, playing single leg round-robin. The top two teams from each group advanced to a single leg knockout stage. The final winner advanced to the inter-confederation play-offs.

Final stage

UEFA

The draw for the first round (group stage) was held in Zürich, Switzerland, on 7 December 2020, 18:00 CET (UTC+1). However, because of the pandemic, the draw was held as a virtual event without any representatives of member associations present. It was originally planned to be held on 29 November. Earlier on 18 June, the UEFA Executive Committee approved the draw regulations for the qualifying group stage. The 55 teams were seeded into six pots based on the FIFA Men's World Rankings of November 2020, after the league phase of the 2020–21 UEFA Nations League.

The qualification format was confirmed by the UEFA Executive Committee during their meeting in Nyon, Switzerland on 4 December 2019. The qualification depends, in part, on results from the 2020–21 UEFA Nations League, although to a lesser degree than UEFA Euro 2020. The structure maintained UEFA's usual 'group stage/playoff stage' structure, with only the specific format of the play-offs amended.
 First round (group stage): Ten groups of either five or six teams with group winners qualifying for the World Cup finals. The four teams in the 2021 UEFA Nations League Finals (France, Belgium, Italy, and Spain) were put into the smaller groups.
 Second round (play-off stage): 12 teams (ten group runners-up and the best two Nations League group winners, based on the Nations League overall ranking, that finished outside the top two of their qualifying group) were drawn into three play-off paths, playing two rounds of single-match play-offs (semi-finals with the seeded teams to host, followed by finals, with the home teams to be drawn), with the three path winners qualifying for the World Cup.

Final positions (first round)

Second round

Inter-confederation play-offs

There were two inter-confederation play-offs to determine the final two qualification spots for the finals. They were played in Qatar on 13–14 June 2022.

AFC v CONMEBOL

CONCACAF v OFC

Top goalscorers

Below are goalscorer lists for all confederations and the inter-confederation play-offs:

AFC
CAF
CONCACAF
CONMEBOL
OFC
UEFA
Inter-confederation play-offs

Notes

References

External links

 
Qualification
FIFA World Cup qualification
Sports events affected by the COVID-19 pandemic
Sports events affected by the 2022 Russian invasion of Ukraine